Goodsell is an English surname. Notable people with the surname include:

Charles Goodsell, Professor Emeritus at Virginia Tech's Center for Public Administration and Policy
David Goodsell, Molecular biologist and science illustrator
Elihu Goodsell (1806–1880), American politician
Jonas Platt Goodsell (1819–1869), American civil engineer and politician from New York
Louis F. Goodsell (1847–1924), New York politician
Major Goodsell, Australian who five times won the professional World Sculling Championship
William Goodsell Rockefeller (1870–1922), director of the Consolidated Textile Company

See also
Goodsell House, historic home located at Old Forge in Herkimer County, New York
Goodsell Observatory, building on the campus of Carleton College in Northfield, Minnesota

English-language surnames